Jagielno may refer to the following places in Poland:
Jagielno, Lower Silesian Voivodeship (south-west Poland)
Jagielno, West Pomeranian Voivodeship (north-west Poland)